Kevin Luckassen (born 27 July 1993) is a Dutch professional footballer who plays as a forward for Liga I side Rapid București.

Club career

AZ Alkmaar
Born in Eindhoven, Luckassen started playing football in the street, leading him to play for his first youth club at Amstelveen Heemrad when he was eight after his mother took him there. He then played for AVV Zeeburgia and AFC Amsterdam before joining AZ Alkmaar in 2009, where he spent five years at the youth team before turning professionally.

He was promoted to the AZ first team squad as an 18-year-old at the start of the 2011–12 season after signing his first professional contract. He made his AZ Alkmaar debut in the second round of KNVB Cup against FC Groningen, which they went on to win 4–2 after the game went extra time. However, Luckassen did not make another first team appearance for the next two seasons. At the end of the 2012–13 season, he was released.

Ross County
In July 2013, he signed a three-year deal with Scottish Premiership club Ross County. He made his debut in a 2–1 defeat against Celtic at Celtic Park in the opening game of the season. Despite suffering from injuries, Luckassen continued to be used in first team ins and out in the first half of the season, making 16 appearances in all competitions.

Slovan Liberec
After six months at Ross County, Luckassen left Ross County to join Gambrinus Liga side Slovan Liberec after the club accepted their bid.

Luckassen made his Slovan Liberec debut, where he started and played for 73 minutes before being substituted, in a 2–2 draw against FK Mladá Boleslav on 23 February 2014. Luckassen scored his first goal on 7 March 2014, as Slovan Liberec won 1-0 against Zbrojovka Brno. He followed up his second goal two weeks later on 21 March 2014, in a 3-0 win over Jablonec.

On 22 August 2014, he scored his first goal of the season, in a 2–2 draw against FK Teplice. By April, Lukassen scored two more goals against Mladá Boleslav and FK Teplice. Luckassen helped his side win the Czech Cup after beating FK Jablonec 2–1 in the final. In the 2015–16 season, Luckassen scored on his first appearance of the season on 16 August 2015, in a 1–1 draw against FK Jablonec. Despite suffering from an injury setback, Luckassen went on to make 13 appearances and scored 3 times in all competitions.

SKN St. Pölten
Luckassen joined SKN St. Pölten on 8 July 2016, signing a two–year contract with the club.

Luckassen made his SKN St. Pölten debut, where he set up a goal for Manuel Hartl, who scored a header, in a 2–1 loss against Austria Wien in the opening game of the season. He then scored his first goal for the club on 15 October 2016, in a 1–1 draw against Admira Wacker Mödling. It wasn’t until 29 April 2017 when he scored a brace and set up one of the goals, in a 3–3 draw against Rheindorf Altach.

However, ahead of the 2017–18 season, Luckassen's contract got terminated by the club on 19 July 2017, after a fight with a teammate during the training.

Northampton Town
On 8 March 2018, Luckassen joined EFL League One side Northampton Town on a deal until the end of the season.

Luckassen scored the equaliser in his debut against Bristol Rovers on 10 March 2018. However, he soon lost his first team place after suffering a back injury and was sidelined for the rest of the season. He was released by Northampton at the end of the 2017–18 season, following their relegation.

International career
Though born in Eindhoven, Netherlands, Luckassen expressed desire to play for Ghana, as his parents are Ghanaian. He previously represented Netherlands U18 and Netherlands U19.

Personal life
Luckassen is an older brother of Derrick Luckassen, who like Kevin, started his professional career at AZ Alkmaar, and cousin of Samuel and Brian Brobbey.

Growing up, he supported AFC Ajax, due to his association at Amstelveen Heemrad and growing up in Amsterdam. In addition to speaking Dutch, Luckassen speaks English and currently learning Czech.

Honours
Slovan Liberec
Czech Cup: 2014–15
Czech Supercup: 2015

Sepsi OSK 
Cupa României: 2021–22

References

External links

 

1993 births
Living people
Footballers from Eindhoven
Eerste Divisie players
Almere City FC players
Scottish Professional Football League players
Ross County F.C. players
Association football forwards
Czech First League players
FC Slovan Liberec players
Dutch expatriate footballers
Dutch expatriate sportspeople in Romania
Dutch expatriate sportspeople in the Czech Republic
Dutch expatriate sportspeople in Scotland
Dutch expatriate sportspeople in England
Dutch expatriate sportspeople in Turkey
Dutch expatriate sportspeople in Austria
Dutch footballers
Dutch sportspeople of Ghanaian descent
Expatriate footballers in Romania
Expatriate footballers in Scotland
Expatriate footballers in the Czech Republic
Expatriate footballers in Austria
Expatriate footballers in England
Expatriate footballers in Turkey
FC Politehnica Iași (2010) players
FC Viitorul Constanța players
Sepsi OSK Sfântu Gheorghe players
Kayserispor footballers
Liga I players
English Football League players
Northampton Town F.C. players
Austrian Football Bundesliga players
SKN St. Pölten players
Netherlands youth international footballers